Percy Wootton is an American cardiologist. In June 1997, he became president of the American Medical Association, after having served as a member of the Board of Trustees from 1991 to 1996. Wootton was a clinical professor of medicine at the Medical College of Virginia, Virginia Commonwealth University.

Education
Wootton earned his Bachelor of Science degree from Lynchburg College in 1953.

He earned his medical degree from the Medical College of Virginia, Virginia Commonwealth University in 1957. In medical school, he was a member of the Alpha Omega Alpha Honor Medical Society.
Dr. Wootton returned to Lynchburg College to pursue a Doctorate of Sciences, which he earned in 1998.

Offices held

President, American Medical Association 1997-1998
Board of Trustees Member, American Medical Association 1991-1996
Board of Trustees Member, Lynchburg College
President, Richmond Academy of Medicine
President, Medical Society of Virginia
President, The Richmond Area Heart Association
President, The Virginia Heart Association

Awards & honors

Outstanding Alumnus Award, Medical College of Virginia, 1996
Fellow, American College of Physicians
Fellow, American College of Cardiology

See also

List of presidents of the American Medical Association

References

American cardiologists
Living people
University of Lynchburg alumni
Medical College of Virginia alumni
Fellows of the American College of Cardiology
Year of birth missing (living people)
Presidents of the American Medical Association